The IIHF InLine Hockey World Championship is an annual event held by the International Ice Hockey Federation (IIHF). The first World Championship tournament was decided at the 1996 World Championship. As of 2017, 20 tournaments have been staged. No championship was held in 1999 or in 2016. Five nations have won a gold medal at the World Championships and a total of eight have won medals. United States has won 15 medals, the most of any nation.

Top Division

Champions
Key

Medal table

Countries in italics no longer compete at the World Championships.

Division I

Champions
Key

Medal table

References
IIHF official listing of all medalists

IIHF InLine Hockey World Championship
IIHF InLineHockey World Championships